Pussy Whipped is the debut studio album by American punk rock band Bikini Kill. It was released on Kill Rock Stars on October 26, 1993.

Critical reception

David Browne of Entertainment Weekly called Pussy Whipped "the first great riot-grrrl album". Heather Phares of AllMusic said, "'Rebel Girl' is a manifesto just waiting to be discovered, and the rest of the album sees the band occasionally adding fun to their recipe for punk chaos."

In 2015, Spin placed Pussy Whipped at number 222 on its list of the "300 Best Albums of the Past 30 Years". In 2016, Pitchfork placed it at number 10 on its list of the "50 Best Indie Rock Albums of the Pacific Northwest". Rolling Stone included "Rebel Girl" on its list of the "Most Excellent Songs of Every Year Since 1967", a playlist assembled by the magazine in 2006 to celebrate its 1,000th issue (The version of "Rebel Girl" included here differs from the Joan Jett-produced single version).

Track listing

Personnel
Credits adapted from the liner notes.
 Kathleen Hanna – vocals (all tracks except "Speed Heart", "Tell Me So", and "Hamster Baby"), bass guitar ("Star Fish")
 Billy Karren – guitar
 Kathi Wilcox – bass guitar (all tracks except "Star Fish"), vocals ("Speed Heart")
 Tobi Vail – drums, vocals ("Tell Me So" and "Hamster Baby")
 Stuart Hallerman – production, engineering
 Tammy Rae Carland – cover photography

Charts

References

External links
 

1993 debut albums
Bikini Kill albums
Kill Rock Stars albums